13 Cameras is a 2016 American horror film written and directed by Victor Zarcoff. The film was originally titled Slumlord, before being renamed.

Synopsis
The film revolves around a newlywed couple who move into a new house across the country, only to find out that their landlord has been spying on them.

Cast
 Neville Archambault as Gerald
 Sean Carrigan as Camera Guy Joe
 PJ McCabe as Ryan
 Brianne Moncrief as Claire
 Jim Cummings as Paul
 Heidi Niedermeyer as Audrey
 Sarah Baldwin as Hannah
 Andy Gould as Zulu
 Ethan Rosenberg as Pet Store Clerk
 DeForrest Taylor as Officer
 Thomas Modifica Jr. as Officer
 Michaela McManus as Tenant
 Gabriel Daniels as Junior

Critical Reception
On Rotten Tomatoes the film has a 77% approval rating from critics based on 13 reviews. Dennis Harvey of Variety gave a positive review, writing that it "ratchets up a fair amount of suspense and intrigue" and declaring that it did "a good job building tension", while criticising the lack of characterisation given to the villain. Justin Lowe of The Hollywood Reporter gave a mixed review, declaring that it was somewhat suspenseful, while criticising its characterisation as shallow.

Sequel
A sequel titled 14 Cameras was released in 2018.

References

External links

2016 horror films
American horror films
2010s English-language films
2010s American films